Aliabad-e Varkaneh (also Romanized as ‘Alīābād-e Varkāneh; also known as ‘Alīābād) is a village in Alvandkuh-e Sharqi Rural District, in the Central District of Hamadan County, Hamadan Province, Iran. At the 2006 census, its population was 162, in 46 families.

References 

Populated places in Hamadan County